A residual is generally a quantity left over at the end of a process.  It may refer to:

Business
 Residual (entertainment industry), in business, one of an ongoing stream of royalties for rerunning or reusing motion pictures, television shows or commercials
 Profit (accounting), residuals that shareholders, partners or other owners are entitled to, after debtors are covered 
Residual in the bankruptcy of insolvent businesses, moneys that are left after all assets are sold and all creditors paid, to be divided among residual claimants
 Residual (or balloon) in finance, a lump sum owed to the financier at the end of a loan's term; for example Balloon payment mortgage

Mathematics, statistics and econometrics
 Residual (statistics)
 Studentized residual
 Residual time, in the theory of renewal processes
 Residual (numerical analysis)
 Minimal residual method
 Generalized minimal residual method
 Residual set, the complement of a meager set
 Residual property (mathematics), a concept in group theory
 Residually finite group, a specific residual property
 The residual function attached to a residuated mapping
 Residual in a residuated lattice, loosely analogous to division
 Residue (complex analysis)
 Solow residual, in economics

Geomorphology
A residual is the remnant of a formerly extensive mass of rock or land surface
 Inselberg
 Mesa
 Monadnock

Other uses 
 Residual volume, the amount of air left in the lungs after a maximal exhalation; see Lung volumes

See also
 
 Residue (disambiguation)